Stenoporpia pulmonaria is a species of geometrid moth in the family Geometridae. It is found in North America.

The MONA or Hodges number for Stenoporpia pulmonaria is 6463.

Subspecies
These seven subspecies belong to the species Stenoporpia pulmonaria:
 Stenoporpia pulmonaria albescens Hulst, 1896
 Stenoporpia pulmonaria blattifera Rindge, 1968
 Stenoporpia pulmonaria dejecta Hulst, 1896
 Stenoporpia pulmonaria lita Rindge, 1968
 Stenoporpia pulmonaria pulmonaria
 Stenoporpia pulmonaria satisfacta Barnes & McDunnough, 1916
 Stenoporpia pulmonaria vicaria Rindge, 1968

References

Further reading

External links

 

Boarmiini
Articles created by Qbugbot
Moths described in 1881